Martina Haag, (born Helen Martina Uusma on 9 June 1964) is a Swedish actress and author. Martina Haag's father came to Sweden as a refugee from Estonia. She has acted in the film Underbar och älskad av alla in 2005. The film was made from her novel book with the same name. She participated in Let's Dance 2018 broadcast on TV4.

Together with host Erik Haag, she has four children. After 18 years of marriage, the couple filed for divorce in 2013 and divorced in 2014.

Books
2004: Hemma hos Martina
2005: Underbar och älskad av alla (och på jobbet går det också jättebra)
2006: Martina-koden
2008: I en annan del av Bromma
2010: Fånge i hundpalatset
2011: Glada hälsningar från Missångerträsk
2012: Heja, Heja!
2015: Det är något som inte stämmer

Filmography
Films
1995: Älskar, älskar inte
1997: Adam & Eva
1997: Selma & Johanna – en roadmovie
2000: Det blir aldrig som man tänkt sig
2000: Naken
2001: Känd från TV
2005: Halva sanningen
2007: Underbar och älskad av alla
2010: Toy Story 3 (voice over in Swedish)

Television
1996: Percy tårar
1996: Pentagon (TV series)
1997: Silvermannen 
2001: Heja Björn

References

1964 births
Living people
People from Lidingö Municipality
Swedish people of Estonian descent
Swedish actresses